This is a summary of 1985 in music in the United Kingdom, including the official charts from that year.

Summary
The biggest British musical event of 1985 was the Live Aid concert in London's Wembley Stadium on 13 July. Held to follow up the previous year's charity record "Do They Know It's Christmas?", the biggest-selling single ever at the time, popular acts such as The Who, U2 and Queen performed in front of an estimated audience of 1.9 billion viewers. It raised £150 million to help famine in Ethiopia, and a similar event would happen 20 years later in 2005, with Live 8.

After the huge success of Band Aid's "Do They Know It's Christmas?", several more charity songs reached number 1 this year. USA for Africa, inspired by Band Aid, released "We Are the World", a song written by Michael Jackson and Lionel Richie, while David Bowie and Mick Jagger released a cover of "Dancing in the Street", the music video being premiered at Live Aid and all proceeds going to the charity. In May, a fire at a football stadium in Bradford killed 56 people, and supergroup The Crowd released a charity cover of popular football anthem "You'll Never Walk Alone" in tribute.

British rock band Dire Straits released their album Brothers in Arms in May, one of the first ever albums to be released on compact disc and the format's first million-seller. It went on to become the UK's best-selling album of the entire decade and remains one of the top ten best-selling albums of all time in the UK. Four singles were released from the album, including the UK number 4 hit and US number 1 "Money for Nothing", which referenced American music channel MTV and had a groundbreaking video featuring early computer-generated imagery. When a European version of MTV launched in 1987, it was the first video ever played on the channel.

Jennifer Rush entered the top 75 in June with the power ballad "The Power of Love", which remained in the chart for months without entering the top 40. When it finally did in September, it quickly hit number 1, where it remained for five weeks and was the biggest selling single of the year. It sold over a million copies, however it would be the last single of the decade to do so, and there would not be another million-seller until 1991.

Many songs this year competed for the Christmas number one single, and the entire top 3 from 1984 re-entered the chart this year; Paul McCartney's "We All Stand Together" at number 32, Wham!'s "Last Christmas" at number 6, and Band Aid's "Do They Know It's Christmas?" at number 3. There were also attempts from Bruce Springsteen with a cover of "Santa Claus Is Coming to Town", and ventriloquist Keith Harris released a cover of "White Christmas" with his green puppet Orville the Duck.

However, the Christmas number one went to Shakin' Stevens with the song "Merry Christmas Everyone". It had been intended to be released in 1984, but was kept back a year due to the Band Aid charity single. Still a widely known Christmas song in the 21st century, it re-entered the chart in Christmas 2007 on downloads alone, at number 22.

John Rutter, hitherto best known for his popular modern carols, acknowledged his classical roots with his Requiem, which was premièred in October in Sacramento, California. Less than eight months earlier, Andrew Lloyd Webber's Requiem had its première in New York. Paul Miles-Kingston, the boy soprano who won a silver disc for his recording of the "Pie Jesu" from that work, became Head Chorister of Winchester Cathedral in the same year. The prolific Peter Maxwell Davies (who had moved to Orkney in 1971) produced one of his most popular works, An Orkney Wedding, with Sunrise, notable for featuring the bagpipes as a lead instrument. Veteran Welsh composer Daniel Jones, produced his 12th symphony, at the age of 73, whilst 80-year-old Michael Tippett began work on his last opera, New Year.

Events
15 March - Jesus & Mary Chain perform a gig at North London Polytechnic lasting less than 20 minutes and after appearing late on stage, which escalates into a riot, resulting in audience members storming the stage and smashing up the band's equipment, causing £8000 worth of damage.
13 July - Live Aid is held as a benefit concert at London's Wembley Stadium.  72,000 people attend and the event raises over £150 million in aid of famine relief.

Charts

Number one singles

Number one albums

Year-end charts

Best-selling singles
Based on sales from 5 January to 28 December 1985.

Best-selling albums
Based on sales from 5 January to 28 December 1985.

Notes:

Classical music: new works
Peter Maxwell Davies – An Orkney Wedding, with Sunrise
Andrew Lloyd Webber – Requiem
John Rutter – Requiem

Film and Incidental music
Michael Nyman - A Zed and Two Noughts directed by Peter Greenaway.

Musical films
Billy the Kid and the Green Baize Vampire, with Phil Daniels

Births
6 January - Ben Haenow, singer
11 January - Newton Faulkner, singer
2 March - Luke Pritchard, singer (The Kooks)
4 February - Bashy, recording artist and actor
3 April - Leona Lewis, singer
2 May - Lily Allen, singer, songwriter
21 May
Kano, rapper
Mutya Buena, singer and former member of (Sugababes)
7 June - Charlie Simpson, singer and musician (Busted, Fightstar)
15 June - Nadine Coyle, singer (Girls Aloud)
5 July - Nick O'Malley, musician (Arctic Monkeys)
8 July - Jamie Cook, musician (Arctic Monkeys)
17 July - Tom Fletcher, singer (McFly)
23 July - Matthew Murphy, musician (The Wombats)
5 October - Nicola Roberts, singer (Girls Aloud)
9 October - Frankmusik, singer-songwriter, record producer, musician, remixer
10 October - Marina Diamandis, singer-songwriter (Marina and the Diamonds)
1 November - Dizzee Rascal, rapper
19 December - Lady Sovereign, singer, musician
23 December - Harry Judd, drummer (McFly)
25 December - Leon Pisani, singer (V)

Deaths
6 February - Neil McCarthy, actor and pianist, 62 (motor neurone disease)
7 February - Matt Monro, singer, 54
27 February
J. Pat O'Malley, singer and film actor, 86
Ray Ellington, singer, 68
28 February - David Byron, singer (Uriah Heep), 38 (alcohol-related)
19 April - Ivan Menzies, operatic baritone, 88
30 July - Peter Knight, conductor, arranger and composer, 68 
11 September - William Alwyn, composer, 79 
25 October - Gary Holton, singer-songwriter, musician and actor, 33 (alcohol and drug overdose)
18 December - Jolyon Jackson, musician and composer, 37 (Hodgkins' disease)
12 December - Ian Stewart, musician, founding member and road manager for (The Rolling Stones), 47 (heart attack)
30 December - Bob Pearson, singer and pianist with his brother Alf (half of Bob and Alf Pearson), 78

Music awards

Brit Awards
The 1985 Brit Awards winners were:
 Best British comedy recording: Neil (also known as Nigel Planer) - "Hole In My Shoe"
 Best British producer: Trevor Horn
 Best classical recording: Antonio Vivaldi's - "The Four Seasons"
 Best international artist: Prince and the Revolution
 Best soundtrack: "Purple Rain"
 British album: Sade - "Diamond Life"
 British female solo artist: Alison Moyet
 British group: Wham!
 British male solo artist: Paul Young
 British single: Frankie Goes to Hollywood - "Relax"
 British Video: Duran Duran - "The Wild Boys"
 Outstanding contribution: The Police
 Special Award: Bob Geldof and Midge Ure

See also
 1985 in British radio
 1985 in British television
 1985 in the United Kingdom
 List of British films of 1985

References

External links
 BBC Radio 1's Chart Show
 The Official Charts Company

 
British music
British music by year